Carex pyramidalis is a tussock-forming perennial in the family Cyperaceae. It is native to parts of Madagascar and the Comoros Islands.

The only synonym is Carex gonochorica Cherm.

See also
 List of Carex species

References

pyramidalis
Plants described in 1903
Taxa named by Georg Kükenthal
Flora of Madagascar
Flora of the Comoros